Roger Andermatt (born 1969), known as The Death-Keeper of Lucerne, is a Swiss serial killer. With 22 claimed victims between 1995 and 2001, he is the most prolific serial killer in Swiss criminal history.

Life 
Andermatt worked as a nurse in various retirement homes in central Switzerland, including the retirement home Eichhof in Lucerne. All his victims were in need of care. The murders were noticed by an accumulation of deaths in certain homes. The victims in question's bodies were exhumed and autopsied in 2001. Andermatt was also known as a dance teacher and a DJ by the name "R.O-Gee".

Andermatt was convicted on January 28, 2005, by the Lucerne Criminal Court for murder in 22 cases, attempted murder in three cases and unfinished murder in two cases with resignation and life imprisonment. Thus, the court's punishment was above the prosecutor's request, and, in particular, did not follow the line of defense (killing out of sympathy).

On February 15, 2006, the sentence was upheld at a second hearing. The Lucerne High Court convicted Andermatt but only in seven murder cases. The remaining 15 cases were classified as deliberate killings. There are also three completed and two unfinished killing attempts. Owing to the high number of victims, the court decided to sentence Andermatt to life imprisonment.

Andermatt confessed to the murders, but claims to have acted out of compassion. He also complained that he and the nursing team had been overwhelmed.

See also
List of serial killers by country
List of serial killers by number of victims

References 

1969 births
1995 murders in Switzerland 
1999 murders in Switzerland
2001 murders in Switzerland 
1990s murders in Switzerland 
2000s murders in Switzerland
20th-century criminals
Living people
Male serial killers
Medical serial killers
Poisoners
Swiss serial killers
Swiss prisoners sentenced to life imprisonment
Swiss prisoners and detainees
Prisoners and detainees of Switzerland